"Little 15" is a song by English electronic music band Depeche Mode, released on 16 May 1988 as the fourth single from their sixth studio album, Music for the Masses (1987). The song was never intended to be a single; in fact, it barely made it onto the album, but a French record label wanted to release the song as a single, which became a popular import and reached number 60 on the UK Singles Chart.

Release
The song's title, as well as its status as a minor release, contributed to its special catalog number "LITTLE15".  In this vein, it can be seen as a "little" release between BONG15 ("Behind the Wheel") and BONG16 ("Everything Counts [Live]"). "Little 15" didn't chart in France, but finally was also released as a single in other countries becoming a success: in West Germany, where it hit #16, in Austria where it reached #25 and in Switzerland where it entered the Top 20 at #18.

There was no remix of the song at the time of release (the 12" and 7" versions were the same); however, there are two piano instrumental B-sides, both performed by Alan Wilder. The first is "Stjärna" (Swedish for 'star') (mislabelled "St. Jarna"), written by Martin Gore. The 12" b-side also contains a performance of Ludwig van Beethoven's "Moonlight Sonata #14."  According to his website, Wilder did not intend for it to be a b-side, as he was merely performing it for fun, but Gore stealthily recorded it. Wilder did not perform the song perfectly (his error occurs near the end of the song).

The music video for "Little 15" was directed by Martyn Atkins, who had done previous design work for the band. The music video was filmed in the Trellick Tower in London.

Reception
In a positive review for AllMusic, Ned Raggett highlighted the song's "subtle orchestrations" and "David Gahan's subtly impassioned performance".

Track listing

Charts

References

External links
 Single information from the official Depeche Mode website

1987 songs
1988 singles
Depeche Mode songs
Mute Records singles
Song recordings produced by Daniel Miller
Songs written by Martin Gore